Mary Stults Sherman (April 21, 1913 – July 21, 1964) was an American orthopedic surgeon and  cancer researcher affiliated with the University of Chicago and the Oschsner Foundation Hospital in New Orleans. Her 1964 murder remains unsolved.

Early Life and Career

Mary Caroline Stults was born in Evanston, Illinois to Walter Allen Stults and Monica Edith Graham, both singers and music educators.  She had initially trained in opera, studying in Paris before returning to Evanston and earning degrees in French at Northwestern University. 
She taught at the University of Illinois French Institute in Paris and then went on to earn her medical degree from the University of Chicago in 1941.  She married Dr. Thomas Watson Sherman in 1936. 

After graduating from medical school, Sherman served as an associate professor of orthopedic surgery at the University of Chicago during which time she focused her research on bone cancer and polio treatments.  In 1949 and 1950, she traveled through Alaska performing medical surveys in remote communities and serving for a time at Mount Edgecumbe hospital on Kruzof Island.  

In 1952, Sherman was appointed to the Ochsner Foundation Hospital as director of the Bone Pathology Laboratory and served as orthopedic surgeon in the clinic. She was also an associate professor of clinical orthopedics at Tulane University’s School of Medicine.  In 1963 she and a colleague received the Kappa Delta Award for Orthopedic Research for their work studying the causes of clubfoot.

Publications
Sherman was the author or coauthor of numerous articles about bone and joint diseases.  As examples, her works included:

"The pathology of ununited fractures of the neck of the femur"
"Infantile cortical hyperostosis; review of the literature and report of five cases"
"The non-specificity of synovial reactions"
"Mechanism of pain in osteoid osteomas"

Death
On July 21, 1964, firefighters responding to a call from Sherman's neighbors discovered her body beneath a burning mattress in her apartment on St. Charles Avenue in New Orleans. The coroner classified Sherman's death as a homicide citing lethal stab wounds and severe burns to her upper torso and right arm. 
Police stated that her purse was missing and somebody had attempted to pry open a jewelry box on the premises. Her car would be discovered hours later abandoned on a city street several blocks from the crime scene.  

While police theorized that Sherman fell victim to a botched burglary or was murdered by an acquaintance, conspiracy theories link her to the alleged Kennedy assassination conspirator David Ferrie and propose that Sherman participated in clandestine scientific research that led to her death.

In Popular Culture
Edward Haslam wrote a book about Dr. Sherman titled Dr. Mary's Monkey (2007)

References

Further reading
"Sherman murder", The Times-Picayune, July 22, 23, 31, 1964.
New Orleans States-Item, July 21, 31, 1964.
Associated Press. "New Orleans Doctor's Death Is Probed". The Day, July 22, 1964, p. 27.
Michael Bonfiglio (1977). "In memoriam: Mary Stults Sherman, M.D.". Journal of Surgical Oncology, 9(1):1–2. .
FA Riddick Jr (2007). "Ochsner in Literature—nonfiction". The Ochsner Journal, 7(3):140–146. PMC 3096393. This article includes a critical review of Dr. Mary's Monkey, a book authored by Edward T. Haslam.

External links
Autographed portrait of Mary Stults Sherman. United States National Library of Medicine: Images from the History of Medicine.
Ochsner Hospital staff 1954, {{YouTube|9GyAeg5xy6c|zoom to Dr. Mary Sherman}} (Video).

1913 births
1964 deaths
1964 murders in the United States
American pathologists
Women pathologists
Women medical researchers
American orthopedic surgeons
Northwestern University alumni
American oncologists
Women oncologists
People from Evanston, Illinois
People from New Orleans
People murdered in Louisiana
Tulane University faculty
University of Chicago alumni
Unsolved murders in the United States
American murder victims
Deaths by stabbing in the United States
20th-century American physicians
20th-century American women scientists
20th-century American women physicians
Women surgeons
20th-century surgeons
American women academics
 University of Illinois faculty
Female murder victims